Empress Duan is the name of:

Empress Duan (An Lushan's wife), second wife of An Lushan, emperor of state of Yan in Tang Dynasty (756-757)
Empress Duan (Huimin) (4th-century–400), empress of the Chinese/Xianbei state Later Yan (396-398)
Empress Duan Jifei (4th-century–5th-century), empress of the Chinese/Xianbei state Southern Yan (398-405)
Empress Duan Yuanfei (died 396), empress of the Chinese/Xianbei state Later Yan (388-396)

See also
Princess Duan (disambiguation)

Duan